Eddie Boyle (1915 - December 2000) was an Irish Gaelic footballer who played as a full-back for the Louth senior team.

Born in Greenore, County Louth, Boyle first arrived on the inter-county scene at the age of seventeen when he first linked up with the Louth minor team before later joining the junior side. He later made his senior championship debut. Boyle enjoyed a lengthy career and won two Leinster medal.

As a member of the Leinster inter-provincial team on a number of occasions, Boyle won five Railway Cup medals. At club level he was a two-time championship medallist with Cooley Kickhams.

In retirement from playing, Boyle was chosen at full-back on a special team of the century made up of players who never won an All-Ireland medal. He was posthumously chosen on the Louth Football Team of the Millennium.

References

1915 births
2000 deaths
Cooley Kickhams Gaelic footballers
Louth inter-county Gaelic footballers
Leinster inter-provincial Gaelic footballers